Carmel  is a suburban city in Indiana, United States, immediately north of Indianapolis. Although Carmel was home to one of the first electronic automated traffic signals in the state, the city has constructed 141 roundabouts between 1988 and 2022.

History
Carmel was originally called "Bethlehem". It was platted and recorded in 1837 by Daniel Warren, Alexander Mills, John Phelps, and Seth Green. The original settlers were predominantly Quakers. Today, the plot first established in Bethlehem, located at the intersection of Rangeline Road and Main Street, is marked by a clock tower, donated by the local Rotary Club in 2002. A post office was established as "Carmel" in 1846 because Indiana already had a post office called Bethlehem. The town of Bethlehem was renamed "Carmel" in 1874, due to the need of a post office, at which time it was incorporated.

In 1924, one of the first automatic traffic signals in the U.S. was installed at the intersection of Main Street and Rangeline Road. The signal was the invention of Leslie Haines and is currently in the old train station on the Monon Trail.

The Carmel Monon Depot, John Kinzer House, and Thornhurst Addition are listed on the National Register of Historic Places.

Geography
Carmel occupies the southwestern part of Hamilton County, adjacent to Indianapolis and, with the annexation of Home Place in 2018, is now entirely coextensive with Clay Township. It is bordered to the north by Westfield, to the northeast by Noblesville, to the east by Fishers, to the south by Indianapolis in Marion County, and to the west by Zionsville in Boone County.

Major east–west streets in Carmel generally end in a 6 and include 96th Street (the southern border), 106th, 116th, 126th, 131st, 136th, and 146th (which marks the northern border). The numbering system is aligned to that of Marion and Hamilton counties. Main Street (131st) runs east–west through Carmel's Art & Design District; Carmel Drive runs generally east–west through the main shopping area, and City Center Drive runs east–west near Carmel's City Center project.

North–south streets are not numbered and include (west to east) Michigan, Shelborne, Towne, Ditch, Spring Mill, Meridian, Guilford, Rangeline, Keystone, Carey, Gray, Hazel Dell, and River. Some of these roads are continuations of corresponding streets in Indianapolis. Towne Road replaces the name Township Line Road at 96th Street, while Westfield Boulevard becomes Rangeline north of 116th Street. Meridian Street (US 31) and Keystone Parkway (formerly Keystone Avenue/SR 431) are the major thoroughfares, extending from 96th Street in the south and merging just south of 146th Street. The City of Carmel is nationally noted for having well over 100 roundabouts within its borders, with even more presently under construction or planned.

Demographics

According to a 2017 estimate, the median household income in the city was $109,201.

The median home price between 2013 and 2017 was $320,400.

2010 census
As of the census of 2010, there were 79,191 people, 28,997 households, and 21,855 families residing in the city. The racial makeup of the city was 85.4% White, 3.0% African American, 0.2% Native American, 8.9% Asian, 0.7% from other races, and 1.8% from two or more races. Hispanic or Latino people of any race were 2.5% of the population.

There were 28,997 households, of which 41.7% had children under the age of 18 living with them, 66.6% were married couples living together, 6.3% had a female householder with no partner present, 2.4% had a male householder with no partner present, and 24.6% were non-families. 20.8% of all households were made up of individuals, and 6.7% had someone living alone who was 65 years of age or older. The average household size was 2.71 and the average family size was 3.18.

The median age in the city was 39.2 years. 29.4% of residents were under the age of 18; 5.3% were between the ages of 18 and 24; 25.2% were from 25 to 44; 29.7% were from 45 to 64; and 10.4% were 65 years of age or older. The gender makeup of the city was 48.7% male and 51.3% female.

Economy
The Meridian Corridor serves as a large concentration of corporate office space within the city. It is home to more than 40 corporate headquarters and many more regional offices. Several large companies reside in Carmel, and it serves as the national headquarters for Allegion, CNO Financial Group, MISO,  and Delta Faucet.

Top employers
, the city's 10 largest employers were:

Carmel also serves as the global headquarters of the North American Interfraternity Conference, an association of multiple fraternities and sororities. Carmel also serves as the global headquarters for six fraternities and sororities: Alpha Kappa Lambda, Alpha Sigma Phi, Lambda Chi Alpha, Theta Chi, Sigma Delta Tau, and Sigma Kappa.

Arts and culture

Rollfast Gran Fondo
Indiana's only Gran Fondo, this cycling event attracts professional cyclists as well as recreational riders. In 2019, the event is the World Championship for the Gran Fondo World Tour. Each route is fully supported with food, drinks, and mechanical support.

Carmel Farmers Market
Founded in 1998, the Carmel Farmers Market is one of the largest in the state of Indiana, with over 60 vendors of Indiana-grown and/or produced edible products. The market, which is managed by an all-volunteer committee, is held each Saturday morning from mid-May through the first weekend of October on Center Green at the Palladium, the farmers market attracts over 60,000 people a year.

Carmel Monon Community Center
A $24.5 million water park and fitness center is the centerpiece of Carmel's $55 million Central Park, which opened in 2007. The Outdoor Water Park consists of two water slides, a drop slide, a rock-climbing wall, a lazy river, a kiddie pool, a large zero depth activity pool, Flowrider, and a lap pool. The fitness center consists of an indoor lap pool, a recreation pool with its own set of water slides and a snack bar, gymnasium,  indoor running track, and the Kids Zone childcare. The building housing the Carmel Clay Parks Department offices is connected by an elevated walkway over the Monon Trail.

Monon Trail

The Monon Greenway is a multi-use trail that is part of the Rails-to-Trails movement. It runs from 10th Street near downtown Indianapolis through Broad Ripple and then crosses into Carmel at 96th Street and continues north through 146th Street into Westfield and continues to Sheridan. The trail ends in Sheridan near the intersection of Opel and 236th streets.

Carmel Arts & Design District

Designed to promote small businesses and local artisans, Carmel's Arts and Design District and City Center is in Old Town Carmel and flanked by Carmel High School on the east and the Monon Greenway on the west, with the state goal of celebrating the creativity and craftsmanship of the miniature art form.. The district includes the Carmel Clay Public Library, the Hamilton County Convention & Visitor's Bureau and Welcome Center, and a collection of art galleries, boutiques, interior designers, cafes, and restaurants. Lifelike sculptures by John Seward Johnson II ornament the streets of the district.

The district hosts several annual events and festivals. The Carmel Artomobilia Collector Car Show showcases classic, vintage, exotic and rare cars, along with art inspired by automobile design. Every September, the Carmel International Arts Festival features a juried art exhibit of artists from around the world, concerts, dance performances, and hands-on activities for children.

In the heart of the district stands the Museum of Miniature Houses, open since 1993. The museum has seven exhibit rooms of fully furnished houses, room displays, and collections of miniature glassware, clocks, tools, and dolls.

Carmel City Center

Carmel City Center is home to The Palladium at the Center for the Performing Arts, which includes a 1,600-seat concert hall, 500-seat theater, and 200-seat black box theater. This pedestrian-based master plan development is located at the southwest corner of City Center Drive (126th Street) and Range Line Road. The Monon Greenway runs directly through the project. Carmel City Center was developed as a public/private partnership.

Shopping
Clay Terrace is one of the largest retail centers in Carmel. Other shopping areas include Carmel City Center, Mohawk Trails Plaza, and Merchants' Square. The Carmel Arts & Design District has a number of retail establishments along Main Street, Range Line Road, 3rd Avenue, and 2nd Street.

Kawachinagano Japanese Garden
Ground was broken for the Japanese Garden south of City Hall in 2007. The garden was dedicated in 2009 as the 15th anniversary of Carmel's Sister City relationship with Kawachinagano, Japan, was celebrated. An Azumaya-style tea gazebo was constructed in 2011 and dedicated on May 2 of that year.

Great American Songbook Foundation 
The Great American Songbook Foundation is the nation's only foundation and museum dedicated to preserving the music of the early to mid 1900s. The foundation is led by Michael Feinstein, who is also the artistic director of the Center for the Performing Arts.

Government

The government consists of a mayor and a city council. The current mayor is James Brainard, who has served since 1996. The city council consists of nine members. Six are elected from individual districts and three are elected at-large.

Planned development
In mid-2017, the city council was considering a multimillion-dollar bond issue that would cover the cost of roundabouts, paths, roadwork, land acquisition by the Carmel Redevelopment Commission and would include the purchase of an antique carousel from a Canadian amusement park for an estimated purchase price of CAD $3 million, approximately US$2.25 million. However, a citizen led petition drive against the purchase caused the city counsel to remove it from the bond issue.

According to the Indiana Department of Local Government Finance, as of 2019 the City of Carmel had an overall debt load of $1.3 billion.

List of mayors

Education

Public schools

The Carmel Clay Schools district has 11 elementary schools (Kindergarten - Grade 5), three middle schools (Grades 6–8), and one high school (Grades 9–12). Student enrollment for the district is above 14,500.

The elementary schools include:

 Carmel Elementary (Feeds into Carmel Middle School) 
 Cherry Tree Elementary (Feeds into Clay Middle School)
 Clay Center Elementary (Feeds into Creekside Middle School)
 College Wood Elementary (Feeds into Creekside Middle School)
 Forest Dale Elementary (Feeds into Carmel Middle School)
 Mohawk Trails Elementary (Feeds into Clay Middle School)
 Prairie Trace Elementary (Feeds into Clay Middle School)
 Smoky Row Elementary (Feeds into Carmel Middle School)
 Town Meadow Elementary (Feeds into Creekside Middle School)
 West Clay Elementary (Feeds into Creekside Middle School)
 Woodbrook Elementary (Feeds into Clay Middle School)

The middle schools include:

 Carmel Middle School
 Clay Middle School
 Creekside Middle School

All middle schools feed into Carmel High School.

Private schools
Carmel has several private schools, including:

 Coram Deo Academy (Kindergarten– Grade 12)
 Midwest Academy (Grades 3–12)
 Our Lady of Mount Carmel Catholic School (Kindergarten– Grade 8)
 Pilgrim Lutheran Preschool (Preschool)
 St. Elizabeth Seton Preschool (Preschool, Pre-Kindergarten, and Kindergarten)
 University High School (Grades 9–12)
 Walnut Grove Christian Prep School (Kindergarten– Grade 12)

Notable people
Bernie Allen, baseball player
Ted Allen, television personality
Franklin Booth, pen-and-ink artist
Steve Chassey, Indy Car driver
Pete Dye, golf course designer
Alex Hall, author known for Ben Drowned (2010)
Jay Howard, British racing driver
Steve Inskeep, host of Morning Edition, National Public Radio
Jake Lloyd, former actor known for his portrayal of young Anakin Skywalker in Star Wars: Episode I – The Phantom Menace
Josh McRoberts, former professional basketball player for the Dallas Mavericks
Dorothy Letterman Mengering, mother of comedian and talk show host David Letterman
Mike Pence, 48th vice president of the United States
Rajeev Ram, professional tennis player, winner of 2019 Australian Open – Mixed Doubles tournament
Matt Reiswerg (born 1980), soccer player, coach, and administrator
Takuma Sato, Japanese racing driver
Lee Schmidt, golf course designer
Rob Schmitt, reporter and Fox News co-host, now host at Newsmax TV
Avriel Shull, architectural designer/builder and interior decorator
Zach Trotman, professional hockey player (Boston Bruins, Pittsburgh Penguins)
Sheldon Vanauken, author known for A Severe Mercy (1977)
Seema Verma, health policy consultant and former Administrator of the Centers for Medicare and Medicaid Services
Todd Young, currently the senior United States senator from Indiana

Sister cities
Carmel has four sister cities as designated by Sister Cities International.
 Kawachinagano, Osaka Prefecture, Japan (1994)
 Xiangyang, Hubei, China (2012)
 Jelgava, Semigallia, Latvia (2022)
 Cortona, Tuscany, Italy (2022)

See also

References

External links

 

 
Cities in Indiana
Cities in Hamilton County, Indiana
Indianapolis metropolitan area